Pitcairnia lutescens is a species of plant in the family Bromeliaceae (Monocot flowering plants). It is endemic to Ecuador, where it is known from three locations. It grows in low Andean forest and it is threatened by conversion of the forest to cropland.

References

lutescens
Endangered plants
Endemic flora of Ecuador
Taxonomy articles created by Polbot